The numbered roads in Kawartha Lakes account for  of roads in the Canadian province of Ontario. These roads include King's Highways that are signed and maintained by the province, as well as the  county roads under the jurisdiction of the County of Bruce. The third type of existing roadway in the single-tier municipality of Kawartha Lakes is locally maintained roads also called concession roads and sidelines, which are beyond the scope of this article. A fourth category of roads, secondary highways, have not existed within the region since 1998.

The 49 numbered routes provide year-round access to the mostly rural municipality. The shortest numbered road is Kawartha Lakes Road 3, Hartley Road, a causeway just less than a kilometre long crossing Mitchell Lake.

Before 1998, several additional King's Highways and secondary highways were located in what was then known as Victoria County. These were transferred to the county in 1998. All county roads, including the former provincial highways, were renamed when Victoria County was abolished in 2001 and replaced with the City of Kawartha Lakes.

Types of roads

King's Highways 

As in the rest of Ontario, the provincially maintained highways in Kawartha Lakes are designated with a shield-shaped sign topped with a crown. The highway number is in the centre, with the word ONTARIO below. These signs are known as shields, but may be referred to as reassurance markers. Highway 7, which is part of the Trans-Canada Highway, is also marked with a green maple leaf shield. Highways 7 and 35 together measure  and account for 82.3% of the length of highways. The remaining  comprises Highway 115, a controlled-access freeway in the southern corner of the city; Highway 7A, an alternate route to Highway 7 around the Lindsay area; and Highway 7B, a business route through Lindsay.

Provincially maintained highways generally have greater construction standards than municipally or locally maintained roads. Although they are usually one lane in either direction, several short sections with two lanes in one direction as a passing lane exist along the highways. The municipality's lone freeway, Highway 115, is two lanes in either direction for its entire length.

City roads 
There are 44 numbered city roads in Kawartha Lakes. Kawartha Lakes city roads are signed with a flowerpot-shaped sign, as are most regional and county roads in Ontario. The road number appears in the centre of the sign, with the word KAWARTHA above and the word LAKES below. Like King's Highways, these signs are known as shields.

History 

The City of Kawartha Lakes was formed on January 1, 2001, and was known as Victoria County before that. Alongside this change, all Victoria County Roads received Kawartha Lakes Road designations, with unchanged numbers, and many new routes were established.

Prior to 1998, Victoria County contained twelve King's Highways. As part of a province-wide transfer of highways to municipal governments, known as downloading, seven were given new Victoria County designations following the prior provincial designations. The exceptions are Highway 35A which was renumbered to fill a gap in the route of Victoria County Road 8, and Highway 36B which was given the new designation of Victoria County Road 17.

The downloaded highways comprises Highway 35A, which was designated Victoria County Road 8; Highway 35B, incorporated into Highway 7B and Victoria County Road 15; Highway 36, designated as Victoria County Road 36; Highway 36B, designated as Victoria County Road 17; Highway 46, designated as Victoria County Road 46; Highway 48, designated as Victoria County Road 48; and Highway 121, designated as Victoria County Road 121.

Highway 7B was also shortened by several kilometres, and now only consists of the portion along Kent Street in Lindsay.

Secondary Highways 
Three secondary highways, which existed in Victoria County prior to 1998, were also downloaded from the province to the county, and given new designations in addition to the downloading of King's Highways:
 Highway 503, which ran from Kirkfield to Kinmount, was renumbered as an extension of Victoria County Road 6 (Kirkfield to Sebright) and Victoria County Road 45 (Sebright to Kinmount).
 Highway 649, which ran from Bobcaygeon north to Highway 121, was renumbered as Victoria County Road 49.

King's Highways 
The following is a list of provincially maintained highways in Kawartha Lakes. Communities are ordered by where the route encounters them (either from south to north or from west to east).

City roads 
The following is a list of the numbered city roads maintained by the City of Kawartha Lakes. Communities are ordered by where the route encounters them (either from south to north or from west to east).

See also

Notes

References

External links 
Official current MTO road map of Ontario, sheet 5 (south-central Ontario)

Ontario county roads
Transport in Kawartha Lakes
Kawartha Lakes